Song I-yeong (1619–?) was a Korean court astronomer of the Joseon dynasty. He invented a weight-powered astronomical clock (possibly the Honcheonsigye) and contributed greatly to the implementation of the Shixian Calendar (from Qing China) in Joseon. He also made systematic observations of two comets.

Armillary clock

In 1659, during the reign of King Hyeonjong, Song I-yeong made an astronomical clock by combining an armillary sphere, long used in East Asia, with the western alarm clock. The result was a device that could both trace the movements of the sun and the moon, as well as display and announce the time. 

The clock was repaired in 1687–1688, after which it disappeared from historical records. In the 1930s, Kim Seong-su purchased the honcheonsigye, which is still housed at Korea University. The historian of science Jeon Sang-woon, who examined the device in 1962, assumed that it was Song I-yeong's device, and the British historian of science Joseph Needham adopted this view. However, Gari Ledyard and O Sang-hak have separately argued that the object dates from much later.

References

1619 births
17th-century Korean astronomers
Korean inventors
17th-century inventors